Various types of vehicles may be known as Transporters:

on railways:
 Transporter wagon, for carrying railway wagons of one gauge on another gauge

on roads:
 Animal transporter, for livestock and other animals
 Self Propelled Modular Transporter, for general heavy road haulage
 Tank transporter, for military tanks over long distances

on other places:
 Crawler-transporter, for the US Space Shuttle
 Transporter erector launcher, for military missiles
 Shipyard transporter, for sections of ship hulls and other heavy objects

ja:トランスポーター (車両)